The Asian Journal of Public Affairs is a biannual academic journal covering public affairs issues pertaining to Asia and the Oceania region. It is edited by graduate students from the Lee Kuan Yew School of Public Policy at the National University of Singapore. The journal's scope includes, but is not limited to, public policy, public management, international relations, international political economy, and economics. Each issue features scholarly submissions, case studies, book reviews, and commentaries.

The journal was established in July 2007, featuring an editorial from Kishore Mahbubani, dean of the Lee Kuan Yew School of Public Policy, among full-length articles from graduate students in the UK, US, China, and Singapore. A printed version was started with the launch of the 5th issue by Kofi Annan in April 2009.

References

External links
 

International relations journals
Public policy
National University of Singapore
Biannual journals
English-language journals